is the twelfth film installment of the Case Closed manga and anime franchise. The initial screening of the film was scheduled on April 19, 2008. An OVA, which takes place three years earlier, was released specially for the film. The OVA was released on DVD as Magic File #2.

Plot

The film opens on the stage of a concert hall where a woman is observing two men during a practice. She sends a message on her cellphone, and then there is an explosion.

Elsewhere, an unknown person with the classic black silhouette of a man reads the news on the computer and comments on how he is getting closer to his plan of a Silent Night.

Later, on the grounds outside the hall, Conan Edogawa talks to Ran Mori on the phone as Shinichi Kudo. He investigates and sees an old man carefully picking up a piano key from the piano destroyed in the explosion, and putting it in his pocket. The man leaves in a car. Ran invites him to go to a rehearsal with her at the concert hall that is opening soon. He declines and tells her she's meddling too much which causes her to angrily reply he will never be like Sherlock Holmes because he's tone deaf. Ran angrily hangs up.

At the rehearsal; Kogoro Mori, Ran, Sonoko Suzuki, and the Detective Boys are introduced to the characters who will be performing for the Domoto Concert Hall opening; Kazuki Domoto the organist and former pianist, Takumi Fuwa the former piano tuner turned director of the hall, Hans Müller as the professional organ tuner, Genya Domoto, son of Kazuki and pianist, Rara Chigusa Soprano, Shion Yuhane  Violinist, and Reiko Akiba the main Soprano. The kids ask Reiko Akiba to help their class choir to sing their school anthem. She agreed, but asks them to leave immediately, possibly to allow Shion, who is shy, perform without fear.

The next day Ran plays the piano while the kids sing the Teitan Elementary School anthem. Akiba comments on their performance; Genta is too loud, Mitsuhiko is not putting enough feelings into it as he was staring at Ai, Ai is singing like an adult, Ayumi is perfect, and Conan is off key the whole time. He is revealed later to have a perfect pitch. Genta steals a drink of Akiba's tea and suffers in agonizing pain.

At the hospital, the doctor says that Genta's throat is severely inflamed by chemicals and he will not be able to speak for about four days. The detective boys, Sonoko, and Akiba accompany Genta home. On the way home they are chased by a truck, so at one of the turns Akiba takes a different route to get the truck away from them. She trips and is about to be run over until a taxi comes and the car turns. The culprit escapes.

Later, two more murders occur. One explosion kills Osamu Shida, with the foot joint of a flute left on the scene. The other murder occurs when the paraglider of the victim is inflicted with fine cuts to cause it to plunge from mid-air. In the victim's car is the headjoint of the flute. These 2 victims, together with the 2 dead victims from the earlier explosion, formerly belonged to a group called the quarter quintet. Conan, indebted to Akiba for a reason he has forgotten, follows her to the forest as she is known to relax there on the day before the concert. She is attacked by a gunner who wounds her leg. They escape when the gunner pauses on shooting the killing shot. She does not report this to the police to avoid missing the concert.

Mori (incorrectly) deduces that the murderer is Genya Domoto as a year ago the quarter quintet badly performed the 9th symphony of Beethoven whilst drunk. Mori assumes Domoto was a Beethoven fanatic and seeing one of his songs defiled by drunks, murdered them. An evidence he points out was Genya's hair was cut the same way as Beethoven. Genya reveals he got his hair from his mother and his hair is natural.

At Domoto Hall, the concert is being prepared. Sonoko says that a balcony is reserved with 10 seats, which is one for Shinichi. After rehearsal Conan and Akiba look for Kazuki to tell him a key for the organ is a little flat. Near a lake, she and Conan are knocked out by the assailant with a wrench. They wake up downstream and hear an explosion coming from the Doumoto Hall. Since the Concert Hall is built to be soundproof and stable, the explosions outside could not be heard inside. The explosions are slowly destroying the pillars outside the hall to prevent entry or exit. Conan sees a phone on top of a building. He explains that phones work by hearing chords (a combination of one or more notes played at the same time) of sounds as numbers. He knocks the phone down with the ball and Akiba and Conan exert the right chords to dial 110, calling the cops.

Conan enters the balcony of the assailant, revealing him to be Takumi Fuwa, while Akiba attempts to stop the explosions by singing Amazing Grace, which is in F major and thus avoids the note that causes explosions. Conan reveals the reason why Fuwa killed the first four people was to avenge his son, (Akiba's fiancé), who died indirectly because of them, as well as his pride as a professional piano tuner being thrown away when Kazuki Domoto quit playing the piano. Without his son, wife, and pride of being a tuner for a professional pianist, his life was nothing and he wanted to bring silence to the organ which haunted him.

Just then the 24th irregular note was played but the final explosion did not occur. Conan reveals that he had already removed the sensor from the organ before he came to Fuwa. Fuwa congratulates him and prepares to press the detonator but it was shot out of his hand by Officer Sato. Fuwa takes out a gun and prepares to commit suicide until Kazuki arrives and reveals to him the reason he quit as a pianist was to keep Fuwa's pride. Because of Fuwa's old age, his hearing was starting to deteriorate and so was his tuning, so to keep his pride Kazuki quit being a pianist so he did not have to hurt his friend. Fuwa comes to realize this and surrenders peacefully.

While outside the concert, Ran hears Amazing Grace played on a violin. She enters the wood where Conan tells her Shinichi played it to her to be forgiven like that day long ago.

At the post credits, Akiba reveals the song Amazing Grace is a song of forgiveness, a favourite of her late fiancee. She sings it on the anniversary of his death near the river which is why she did not pursue revenge like Fuma did for his son. Conan asks how Ran knew it was Shinichi playing the violin. Ran replies he has a weird habit when he plays the violin. Conan is later seen in his house's library playing Amazing Grace to try to find his "strange habit".

Cast
Akira Kamiya as Kogoro Mori
Kappei Yamaguchi as Shinichi Kudo
Minami Takayama as Conan Edogawa
Wakana Yamazaki as Ran Mori
Chafurin as Inspector Megure
Atsuko Yuya as Officer Sato
Ikue Ohtani as Mitsuhiko Tsuburaya
Megumi Hayashibara as Ai Haibara
Naoko Matsui as Sonoko Suzuki
Wataru Takagi  as Genta Kojima and Officer Takagi
Yukiko Iwai as Ayumi Yoshida
Kazuhiko Inoue as Ninzaburo Shiratori

New characters
: Japan's top organist and a former pianist.
: Kazuki's son and a pianist and the concert in-charge. Voiced by 
: Gifted soprano born with perfect pitch and a performer at the concert. She was also an alumnus of Teitan Elementary School attended by Conan.
: Kazuki's assistant, a soprano, and a stand-in for Akiba Reiko.
: Superintendent of Doumoto Concert Hall, had been responsible for maintenance of the pianos of the Doumoto family. He has perfect pitch through experience.
Hans Müller: An organ tuner from Germany. Voiced by Francis Pol.
: Violinist with a Stradivarius.
: Violinist and stand-in for Kawabe Souko.

Film OVA
The film OVA was released on April 19, 2008, two days after the film was released.

Plot
It is three years prior to the film events where Shinichi tries to find a witness to confirm a man's alibi for innocence from the murder of his grandmother; apparently he passed out drinking the day he was supposed to meet his grandmother. The clues are a black lab the man saw when he was drunk and the wall which blocks his view. Genta, Ayumi, and Mitsuhiko are shown in Kindergarten but they are too young to confirm the man's alibi. Shinichi solves the case with the help of his father. In the end, he walks down a path with Ran they notice woman starts singing; the song happens to be "Amazing Grace". Conan voices that the song he heard will be important in the case three years from now.

Many ties have been made to the OVA, specifically the scene where Shinichi and Ran walk down a path beside a river and forest and hearing a woman singing "Amazing Grace", revealed to be Akiba singing.

Music
It was released on April 9, 2008. Along with The Fourteenth Target and Strategy Above the Depths, this is the third Case Closed film theme song by Zard.

The official soundtrack was released on April 16, 2008.

Home media

DVD
The DVD for Full Score of Fear was released on November 19, 2008. There were two types of DVD released; a special version and a regular version. The special version contains the film, and a bonus DVD that contains the trailer, news flash, and commercials of the film. The regular version only contains the film. Both version are in widescreen and 5.1 Dolby Digital Audio.

Blu-ray
The Blu-ray version of the film was released on April 22, 2011. The Blu-ray contains the same content of the DVD plus a mini-booklet explaining the film and the BD-live function.

Reception

Box office
The film debuted at the number one position in the Japanese box office on its release date. As of May 5, 2008 the film has earned over 420.03 million yen. In the Japanese box office, it was twelfth on 2008's Top Domestic Movies earning 2.42 billion yen.

References

External links
 
Official TMS website  
Official NTV website  
Official TMS website  

2008 anime films
TMS Entertainment
Toho animated films
Full Score of Fear
Films directed by Yasuichiro Yamamoto
Animated films set in Tokyo